Vasiliki “Kiki” Dimoula (née Radou; ; 6 June 1931 – 22 February 2020) was a Greek poet. She was the first female poet ever to be included in the prestigious French publisher Gallimard’s poetry series.

Work
Dimoula's work is haunted by the existential dissolution of the post-war era. Her central themes are hopelessness, insecurity, absence and oblivion. Using diverse subjects (from a "Marlboro boy" to mobile phones) and twisting grammar in unconventional ways, she accentuated the power of the words through astonishment and surprise, but always managed to retain a sense of hope.

Her poetry has been translated into English, French, German, Swedish, Danish, Spanish, Italian and many other languages.
In 2014, the eleventh issue of Tinpahar published 'Kiki Dimoula in Translation', which featured three English translations of her better known works.

Recognition
Dimoula was awarded the Greek State Prize twice (1971, 1988), as well as the Kostas and Eleni Ouranis Prize (1994) and the Αριστείο Γραμμάτων of the Academy of Athens (2001). She was awarded the European Prize for Literature for 2009. Since 2002, Dimoula was a member of the Academy of Athens.

Life
Dimoula worked as a clerk for the Bank of Greece. She was married to the poet Athos Dimoulas (1921–1985), with whom she had two children.

Works
Ποιήματα (Poems), 1952
Έρεβος (Erebus), 1956
Ερήμην (In absentia), 1958
Επί τα ίχνη (On the trail), 1963
Το λίγο του κόσμου (The Little of the World),1971
Το Τελευταίο Σώμα μου (My last body), 1981
Χαίρε ποτέ (Farewell Never),1988
Η εφηβεία της Λήθης (Lethe's Adolescence), 1996
Eνός λεπτού μαζί (One Minute's Together), 1998
Ήχος απομακρύνσεων (Departure's Sound), 2001
Χλόη θερμοκηπίου (Glass-house lawn), 2005
Μεταφερθήκαμε παραπλεύρως (We moved next door), 2007
Συνάντηση (Meeting), 2007 (Anthology with seventy-three paintings by John Psychopedis)
Έρανος Σκεψεων, 2009
Τα εύρετρα, 2010
Δημόσιος Καιρός, 2014

Notes

External links
Kiki Dimoula in Translation
Her entry for the 2001 Frankfurt Book Fair (Greek)
Her page at the website of the Hellenic Authors' Society (Greek) and English.
Sound files of her reading her poetry at the Center for Neo-Hellenic Studies
The website of her publishers
European Prize for Literature

1931 births
2020 deaths
Greek women poets
Modern Greek poets
20th-century Greek poets
20th-century Greek women writers
Members of the Academy of Athens (modern)
21st-century Greek poets
21st-century Greek women writers